The Short Mat Players Tour (SMPT) is a semi-professional short mat bowling organisation, that runs singles events through Europe. The tour was the first set of events to create a world ranking for short mat bowls. Events are generally set up in round robin format, with players progressing to a knockout round dependent on their position within their own group. In addition to traditional 4-wood singles events, the SMPT have also run pairs, fours, double-rink and two-wood singles competitions.

Overview
The Short Mat Players Tour is a company responsible for events set up by Craig Burgess and Simon Pridham in 2011. The events have been commercially and corporately successful, and have run events throughout Europe.

The first SMPT event was held in Wey Valley Indoor Bowls Club, Guilford. The event was won by Johnathan Payne of Belgium. The event was followed by events in Sweden, Norway, and Ireland on an annual basis, as well as a United Kingdom open championship. The world masters in 2014, held in Ireland, became the biggest two-day event in short mat bowls history, with an event featuring 252 participants. In addition to these events, the Short Mat Players Tour has run pairs, fours, double rinks and even an event in Cyprus.

In later years, the events would grow to utilise live online results, web entry, and video streaming of certain matches, including knockout rounds, and matches played on a "show mat." Events are split after the group stage, with players being placed in a knockout round dependent on qualification. Those who rank first or second contend the main competition, or Cup; those third and fourth, contend the Plate competition; and those in the bottom two of their round robin group contend the shield, formerly known as the wooden spoon. Those who rank first, second or third win gold, silver and bronze medals, similar to those won in the Olympics.

In the 2018 Norwegian Open; the SMPT partnered with Huldra Film to produce a television standard live stream of the later stages of the event. The tour's most successful player is Ireland's Joeseph Beattie & Mark Beattie, who have five gold medals each.

Event results

Current events

Past ranking tournaments

Order of Merit
The Order of Merit is produced from the six ranking events on the Short Mat Players Tour. The player ranked number 1 at the end of the season is awarded the Short Mat Players Tour Order of Merit sponsored by Henselite Bowls UK.

The short mat players tour events also feature Short Mat Bowls' only world rankings table, with a rolling two year ranking system in place. This is the only world ranking system in place in short mat bowls.

World Cup
Starting in 2015, the Short Mat Players' Tour created a "World Cup", which would contain teams of four, representing each country. The highest ranked four players from each competing country would then represent the team for the world cup. In the first season, in 2015, the event was made up of three groups of three, but was later played in more traditional groups of four. Unlike other world championships, the events feature a "rest of world" team, due to the lack of players from certain countries (such as Germany, India or Italy), but players still need to be placed in the top four of players that are eligible. All games in the world cup are the same as that of the tour, games of singles.

See also
 Short mat bowls
 World Bowls Championship

References

External links
Short Mat Players Tour official website
Results at tournamentsoftware.com

Ball games
Bowls
European sports federations
Bowls in Europe